Elena Bogdan and Alexandra Cadanțu were the defending champions, but lost in the quarterfinals to Raluca Olaru and Anna Tatishvili.
Oksana Kalashnikova and Demi Schuurs won the title, defeating Andreea Mitu and Patricia Maria Țig in the final, 6–2, 6–2.

Seeds

Draw

References 
 Draw

2015 WTA Tour
2015 Doubles